Johan Jakob Albert Ehrensvärd (9 May 1867 – 6 March 1940) was a Swedish diplomat. He was Sweden's envoy to Washington D.C between 1910 and 1911. He became Sweden's Foreign Minister in Liberal leader and Prime Minister Karl Staaff's Second Cabinet. As Foreign Minister of Sweden he instituted reforms in the Swedish Foreign Service and worked to ease tensed relations with Czarist Russia.

1867 births
1940 deaths
Swedish Ministers for Foreign Affairs
Governors of Gothenburg and Bohus County
Ambassadors of Sweden to the United States
Ambassadors of Sweden to France
Ambassadors of Sweden to Belgium
Ambassadors of Sweden to the Netherlands
Ambassadors of Sweden to Switzerland
People from Gothenburg